This table shows an overview of the immovable heritage sites in the Flemish town Hasselt. This list is part of Belgium's national heritage.

|}

See also
 List of onroerend erfgoed in Limburg (Belgium)
Hasselt

References
 Flemish organization for Immovable Heritage, De Inventaris van het Bouwkundig Erfgoed, 2011

Hasselt
Hasselt